Anne Lonnberg (born 17 February 1948) is an American actress and singer of Swedish descent.

Life and career 
Lonnberg was born in Berkeley, California to a Swedish father. She began her acting career in 1965, starring mostly in Greek films. She has appeared throughout her career in a number of American and French films and television series, but only supporting roles. Lonnberg is best remembered for playing the museum guide and one of Drax's girls in the James Bond film Moonraker (1979). Her last role was in the film The Unbearable Lightness of Being (1988), in which she played a Swiss photographer. She has not starred in any other films or series since.

Lonnberg has also made a singing career at the time she started acting, and released a few albums and songs where she sings in French and English.

Lonnberg is fluent in both English and French, and has lived in France for several years.
She is author of novels nowdays with the name Anne de Pasquale.

Filmography
1965: To nisi tis Afroditis
1968: Girls in the Sun - Annabel Stone
1968: Appointment with a stranger - Irene
1968: Mother Goes Greek
1971: The Deadly Trap - La deuxième baby sitter (uncredited)
1974: Paul and Michelle - Susannah
1975: Love and Death - Olga
1975: Synomosia sti Mesogeio - Samantha
1976: Seven Nights in Japan - Jane Hollander 
1977: The Simple Past - Josepha 
1978: Le dernier amant romantique
1979: Moonraker - Museum Guide (Drax's Girl)
1979: Ciao, les mecs - Nicole
1979: Le divorcement - Eva
1982: L'amour des femmes - Hélène
1988: The Unbearable Lightness Of Being - Swiss Photographer

Discography
1969: Anne Lonnberg Lp - Label Riviera

External links 

 Anne Lonnberg – From Sweden with Love

1948 births
American film actresses
American television actresses
American women singers
American people of Swedish descent
Living people
21st-century American women